Rawding is a surname. Notable people with the surname include:

Merrill D. Rawding (1905–2004), Canadian politician
Mike Rawding (1936–2005), English football coach and administrator

See also
Rawling

English-language surnames